Rumelt is a surname. Notable people with the surname include:

Judith Rumelt, better known as Cassandra Clare, (born 1973), American author of young adult fiction
Richard Rumelt (born 1942), American economist